"Buried Treasure" is a song written by Barry, Robin & Maurice Gibb, and recorded by American country music artist Kenny Rogers. It was released as the B-side of "This Woman" in January 1984 as the third single from the album Eyes That See in the Dark.  The song reached number 3 on the Billboard Hot Country Singles & Tracks chart and number 2 on the Canadian RPM Country Tracks chart.

Personnel 1 
Kenny Rogers - vocals
Barry Gibb - guitar, arranger
Maurice Gibb - guitar, bass, synthesizer
Tim Renwick - guitar
George Terry - guitar
George Bitzer - piano, synthesizer
Albhy Galuten - piano, synthesizer, arranger
Ron Ziegler - drums
Joe Lala - percussion
The Gatlin Brothers - vocals

Barry Gibb version
Barry Gibb's version of "Buried Treasure" was a guideline for Rogers' album Eyes That See in the Dark released in 1983, this version was not released until 2006.

This song is a country singalong along the lines of the songs Barry and Maurice had done before, and Maurice appears to be singing the harmony done by The Gatlin Brothers on the completed recording. Gibb's version was recorded around February along with four songs also intended for Rogers' album "Hold Me", "Living with You" and "Islands in the Stream".

Personnel
Barry Gibb - vocals, guitar
Albhy Galuten - piano, synthesizer

References

1984 songs
Kenny Rogers songs
Barry Gibb songs
Songs written by Barry Gibb
Songs written by Maurice Gibb
Songs written by Robin Gibb
Song recordings produced by Barry Gibb